"I Think About You" is a song written by Don Schlitz and Steve Seskin, and recorded by American country music singer Collin Raye.  It was released in February 1996 as the third single and title track from his album of the same name.  It peaked at number 3 in the United States and number 2 in Canada.

Content
The song is an uptempo, with an underlying message about a man who is reminded of his little girl in the image of every woman he sees.

Music video
The music video for the song consisted of Raye portraying a police officer in a reenactment of the TV series Cops.  Raye's daughter Brittany, then 13 years old, appears in the video.

Critical reception
Deborah Evans Price, of Billboard magazine reviewed the song favorably, saying that with Raye's "great voice and honest, heartfeld delivery" the song is a winner.

Chart positions
"I Think About You" debuted at number 67 on the U.S. Billboard Hot Country Singles & Tracks for the week of March 9, 1996.

Year-end charts

References

1996 singles
1995 songs
Collin Raye songs
Songs written by Don Schlitz
Songs written by Steve Seskin
Song recordings produced by Paul Worley
Epic Records singles
Music videos directed by Steven Goldmann